This is a list of songs which reached number one on the Billboard Mainstream Top 40 (or Pop Songs) chart in 2016. 

During 2016, a total of 21 singles hit number-one on the charts, making 2016 the year with the most number-one hits on the Mainstream Top 40.

Chart history

See also
2016 in American music

References

External links
Current Billboard Pop Songs chart

Billboard charts
Mainstream Top 40 2016
United States Mainstream Top 40